The 2006/07 season was the fourth year of the Elite One Championship, the top-level rugby league French Championship. The season commenced on 6 October 2006. Like the previous season, there were 11 teams with one team missing a round each week. A total of 22 rounds were played, with the last finishing on 18 April 2007, before the top four Pia XIII, Toulouse Olympique, Lézignan Sangliers and Saint-Gaudens Bears progressed to the play-offs. Pia XIII beat Lézignan Sangliers in the Grand Final 20-16 which was played at Colomiers. That win completed a double for Pia XIII as they had already lifted the Lord Derby Cup beating AS Carcassonne 30-14. Lyon Villeurbanne XIII finished bottom, finishing with 23 points but it was  Villefranche XIII Aveyron who'd finished 9th who were relegated to the Elite Two Championship, replaced by RC Albi.

Table 

Points win=3: draw=2: loss=1:

Note: (C) = champions, (R) = relegated

Play-offs

Semi-finals 
 Semi-Final - Pia XIII  -  Saint-Gaudens Bears
 Semi-Final - Toulouse Olympique  -  Lézignan Sangliers

Grand Final

References

External links
 rugby league federation

See also 

 Rugby league in France
 French Rugby League Championship
 Elite One Championship

Rugby league competitions in France
2006 in French rugby league
2007 in French rugby league